Khanate is the debut album by Khanate. The album was released in 2001 through Southern Lord Records.

A CDR demo edition titled "tektonikdoom", of which only 20 in yellow vellum were made, was released prior to the release of the actual album. On some copies of the demo, "Pieces of Quiet" was titled "Quiet Time". It was also released on LP with 900 black and 100 transsmoke 220g records being pressed. Julian Cope described this record as an "orchestrated root-canal".

Track listing
All songs written and arranged by Khanate.

Personnel
Alan Dubin: Vocals
Stephen O'Malley: Guitars
James Plotkin: Bass
Tim Wyskida: Drums

References 

2001 debut albums
Khanate (band) albums
Southern Lord Records albums
Albums produced by James Plotkin